Nick English (born 5 November 1978) is a British rower. He competed in the men's lightweight coxless four event at the 2004 Summer Olympics.

References

External links
 

1978 births
Living people
British male rowers
Olympic rowers of Great Britain
Rowers at the 2004 Summer Olympics
Sportspeople from Coventry